Royal Sydney Golf Club is golf club in Rose Bay, New South Wales, Australia, a suburb of Sydney.

Founded in 1893, Royal Sydney is one of Australia's premier sporting and social clubs. It features an 18-hole Championship Course, a 9-hole Centenary Course, two golf practice areas, a golf teaching studio, 18 tennis courts, two bowling greens, two croquet lawns, a squash court, a Fitness Centre as well as an elegant Clubhouse. 

It has hosted the Australian Open on 15 occasions between 1906 and 2016.

History 
Royal Sydney was one of the earliest golf clubs founded in Australia, initially as 'Sydney Golf Club' in 1893, in Concord, New South Wales. Four years later, in 1897, Queen Victoria granted the Club its ‘Royal’ prefix. Tennis, billiards and croquet have been played since 1905 and bowls was introduced in 1929. The current Clubhouse was built in 1922 and, in 2003, was extensively renovated. In 2011, a fitness centre and swimming pool was built.

Golf Courses

Championship Course 

The Championship Course has been accurately described as "an ‘old-fashioned’, traditional, heavily bunkered, tough test of golf, especially in any wind. There are no gimmicks, no tricks, chasms or watery caverns". Its undulating fairways and treacherous bunkers (of which there are more than 120) ensure that the Championship Course is a challenge, even for the most avid golfer.

Centenary Course 
Royal Sydney also offers a  9-hole course called the Centenary Course. It was completely rebuilt to celebrate the 100th anniversary of the Club in 1997. The course was designed to utilise every golf club in the bag for the competent golfer with dynamic terrain, featuring tight fairways and small contoured greens. Water comes into play on six of the nine holes, presenting a further challenge for golfers.

Australian Open Championships 
Royal Sydney has hosted the Australian Open on 15 occasions.

2016 Jordan Spieth 
2013 Rory McIlroy - 
2008 Tim Clark – 
2006 John Senden - 
1999 Aaron Baddeley – 
1994 Robert Allenby – 
1988 Mark Calcavecchia – 
1969 Gary Player – 
1956 Bruce Crampton – 
1946 Ossie Pickworth – 
1934 Billy Bolger – 
1928 Fred Popplewell – 
1922 Charlie Campbell – 
1911 Carnegie Clark – 
1906 Carnegie Clark – 

Royal Sydney has also hosted one Women's Australian Open, in 2007, won by Karrie Webb.

Other Sports

Snooker 

The Royal Sydney Golf Club maintains three Championship quality, full-size tables, which are some of the last remaining among Sydney's private clubs. The Club holds annual singles, doubles and handicap tournaments for snooker, along with a monthly "Lightning Snooker" competition, which takes place on the first Thursday of each month. The snooker room enjoys a strong patronage, with a dedicated Women's evening on Wednesdays and is a popular location following a round of golf or as a book-end to a dining reservation.

Tennis 

Royal Sydney also possesses 18 tennis courts - 11 lawn courts and seven hard courts.

The Club has hosted many tournaments (most recently the 2011 Davis Cup tie between Australia and Switzerland) and produced a number of internationally successful players including Sir Norman Brookes and Gerald Patterson.

Although the starting date of tennis at Royal Sydney is unknown, historical records first indicate the existence of courts in 1905. The popularity of tennis grew and in 1913 another nine courts were laid. By 1920 there were twenty-five courts in play.

In July 2003, Royal Sydney hosted a ladies Federation Cup tie.

Croquet 
The Royal Sydney Golf Club features two croquet lawns which are available for the use of members and their guests all year round. Croquet is a popular sport for many Royal Sydney members with competitions and social days held on a regular basis throughout the year. In March 2009, Royal Sydney hosted the Australian Croquet Championships, and in March 2015 welcomed the Eire Cup (Australian Association Croquet Championships).

Bowls 
Bowls has been played at Royal Sydney since 1929. The Club currently has two bowling greens which are available for the use of members and their guests all year round. The greens are used both for competitive and social play.

Squash 
Squash courts were first constructed at Royal Sydney in 1912. The Club was host to the New South Wales and Australian Championships several times during the 1930s when the game was riding a wave of popularity. Although the popularity of squash waned slightly in the latter part of the 1980s and 1990s, the Club still has a squash court for use by members all year round.

See also

List of golf courses in New South Wales
List of golf clubs granted Royal status

References

External links

The Royal Sydney Golf Club Profile, Golf Australia

1893 establishments in Australia
Sports clubs established in 1893
Sports venues completed in 1893
Golf clubs and courses in New South Wales
Sporting clubs in Sydney
Organisations based in Australia with royal patronage
Sports venues in Sydney
Rose Bay, New South Wales
Royal golf clubs